Below is a list of the Episodes for the Chinese CG animated TV series, The Legend of Qin. See the List of The Legend of Qin Characters for their roles and alternative names.

Series overview

Season 1: 2007
The title for the season is: 百步飞剑 Bai Bu Fei Jian (The Hundred Pace Flying Sword), which is also
Ge Nie's signature move.  It consists of only 10 episodes.

Season 2: 2008
The title for the season is Night Ends - Daybreak（Tianming）. It consists of 18 episodes.

Season 3: 2009
The title for the season is: 诸子百家 Zhu Zi Bai Jia (Masters of the Hundreds of Schools), the word "Hundred" here means many instead of an accurate number. The expression is the classical description for the diverse intellectual life of the Warring States period of Chinese history.

The third season was finished in 2009 and aired in 2010, it consists of 34 episodes.

Season 4: 2012
The title for the season is 万里长城 (wànlǐ chángchéng) and it consists of 37 episodes.

Season 5: 2014

Specials
Birdsong in Hollow Valley: 2014

This special consists of three episodes which tells the story of Baifeng and his friend Moya who were assassins for General Ji Wuye, but who turn against him after Baifeng falls for a female assassin, Nong Yu.

Under Luosheng Tang

This special tells of a young Taoist who joins the Yin-Yang School to find his sister.

Lady Xiang Descends

This special is a story about a wounded man who finds himself caught up in the lives of twin sisters and the man that they both fell in love with.

See also 
List of The Legend of Qin characters
The Legend of Qin animated film

References

Lists of Chinese animated television series episodes